TCHS may refer to:

Tri-Cities High School in East Point, Georgia 
Tates Creek High School in Lexington, Kentucky
Temescal Canyon High School in Lake Elsinore, California
Temple City High School in Temple City, California
Texas City High School in Texas City, Texas
The Chinese High School (Singapore)
The Colony High School in The Colony, Texas
Timber Creek High School in Orlando, Florida
Timber Creek High School in Fort Worth, Texas

Tipton Catholic High School in Tipton, Kansas
Topcoder High School Tournaments, computer programming competition hosted by Topcoder
Treasure Coast High School, in Port St. Lucie, Florida
Trinity Christian High School (disambiguation), multiple schools
Tuscaloosa County High School in Northport, Alabama
Traverse City High School, a former high school in Traverse City, Michigan
Trinity Catholic High School in Woodford Green, United Kingdom
Tyler Consolidated High School in Sistersville, West Virginia
Tuba City High School in Tuba City, Arizona